Clark Island or Clarke Island may refer to:

Clark Island (Antarctica)
Clark Island (New South Wales), an island in Sydney Harbour
Clark Island (Nunavut), Canada
Clarke Island (Tasmania), an Island of the Furneaux Group between Tasmania and Mainland Australia
Clark Island (Washington), one of the San Juan Islands
Clark's Island in Plymouth, Massachusetts, US